Brydan Klein and Joe Salisbury were the defending champions but chose not to defend their title.

Darian King and Noah Rubin won the title after defeating Sanchai Ratiwatana and Christopher Rungkat 6–3, 6–4 in the final.

Seeds

Draw

References
 Main Draw

Stockton Challenger - Doubles